Axel Freudenberg (born 16 June 1954) is a German former swimmer. He competed in the men's 1500 metre freestyle at the 1972 Summer Olympics.

References

External links
 

1954 births
Living people
German male swimmers
Olympic swimmers of East Germany
Swimmers at the 1972 Summer Olympics
Sportspeople from Freiberg
German male freestyle swimmers
21st-century German people
20th-century German people
People from Bezirk Karl-Marx-Stadt